A list of films produced in Egypt in 1983. For an A-Z list of films currently on Wikipedia, see :Category:Egyptian films.

External links
 Egyptian films of 1983 at the Internet Movie Database
 Egyptian films of 1983 elCinema.com

Lists of Egyptian films by year
1983 in Egypt
Lists of 1983 films by country or language